Winchester (Chesil) railway station was, for the first six years after the opening of the line, the terminus of the Didcot, Newbury and Southampton Railway (DNSR), until the line was extended to link up with the Southern Railway line to Southampton. The station buildings were larger than those of any other DNSR station but were built to the standard designs used by the Great Western Railway (GWR). The station buildings were located on the northbound platform. At the northern end of the station the line passed into the double tracked Chesil Tunnel. The station also included a loading bay and single siding at its southern end accessible from the northbound line.

History
Originally named Winchester Cheesehill, the station was opened with the line from Newbury on 4 May 1885. Initially a terminus, since the intended line southwards to Southampton was never completed, it became a through station on 1 October 1891 when a connecting line to the London and South Western Railway (LSWR) was opened, joining the latter at Shawford Junction.

For a short period between 1918 and 1920, the station was the junction point for the Avington line, built to serve the first world war military camps in the Magdalen Hill Down and Avington Park area. This line diverged from the DNSR on the north side of Chesil Tunnel, and was worked by the Railway Operating Department of the United States Army. The line was dismantled after the end of the war removed its reason for existence.

The station closed temporarily on 4 August 1942, reopening on 8 March 1943. The station was renamed Winchester Chesil on 26 September 1949. Like the other stations on the southern part of the line, Winchester Chesil closed on 7 March 1960; but unlike the others, it was reopened for the next two summers: 18 June 1960 to 10 September 1960 and 17 June 1961 to 9 September 1961, on Saturdays only. After closure the station was demolished and the site is now a car park. The goods shed has been converted to business use.

Bar End Yard and Shed
Further to the south of the station was an area of extensive sidings known as the Bar End Yard. There were 4 sidings, two passing loops, a large goods shed, and a ten-ton crane. The goods facilities were withdrawn from 4 April 1966.
Stabling for two horses was located near the main gate; these animals were used to tow a freight delivery  cart.

To the east of the line, adjacent to the goods shed, there was an engine shed which opened . This was one of two which provided locomotives for DNSR services, and the only one to actually be located on the line; the other (Didcot) was on a GWR line, but Winchester was a sub-shed of Didcot. The shed housed a single line of rails, and there was a water tank above the northern end; to the south were a small coal stage and a turntable. On 31 December 1947, two GWR locomotives were based at this shed: Bulldog class 4-4-0 no. 3419, and 2251 class 0-6-0 no. 2252. It closed in July 1953.

Signal box
The signal box at Chesil station was notable for the installation in 1922–23 of an early type of all-electric route-setting using a miniature lever frame in which levers corresponded to appropriate point & signal combinations rather than controlling a single piece of apparatus; the system was designed and supplied by Siemens. It lasted until around 1933 before replacement by an orthodox lever frame giving mechanical control of points and signals – it is believed that the damp conditions of the surrounding area (Chesil station lay partly in a cutting next to St. Giles Hill) caused problems with insulation of the wiring, the installation dating from a time before modern plastics like polythene and PVC were available for use in electrical insulation. The route-setting signal box was only a small scheme and effectively a testbed for a pair of similar but larger installations undertaken at Newport High Street station in South Wales, also during the 1920s.

Routes

Gallery

References

Disused railway stations in Hampshire
Former Great Western Railway stations
Railway stations in Great Britain opened in 1885
Railway stations in Great Britain closed in 1942
Railway stations in Great Britain opened in 1943
Railway stations in Great Britain closed in 1960 
Railway stations in Great Britain opened in 1960 
Railway stations in Great Britain opened in 1961 
Railway stations in Great Britain closed in 1961 
History of Winchester